Colors 
Nikolai Paiva (born June 10, 1988), better known by his stage name Niko Is (stylized as NIKO IS), is a Brazilian-American hip hop recording artist born in Rio de Janeiro, Brazil.  Currently based in Orlando, Florida, he is signed to Talib Kweli's Javotti Media. Niko's catalogue includes projects like Chill Cosby and the Good Blood LP, which were both released to generally positive reviews and moderate success. His Javotti Media debut, Brutus, was produced by frequent collaborator, Thanks Joey and was released to critical acclaim on February 4, 2015.

Early life

Nikolai Paiva was born in Rio de Janeiro, Brazil, his mother's home country. The two moved to Florida when Niko was seven years of age. Niko began showing an interest in music while attending Dr. Phillips High School in Orlando, where he began working with record producer, Thanks Joey. The duo released a number of popular singles and mixtapes. Niko was known in school for performing spontaneous freestyle rap and drawing crowds. After high school, Niko pursued his music career and developed a style influenced by an assortment of genres, from hip hop and funk to jazz and bossa nova.

Career

2012 - Chill Cosby

In 2012 Niko Is independently released Chill Cosby. The mixtape was well received locally and would help Niko garner a strong internet buzz. The single, "Steffi Graf" featuring Action Bronson, was featured on popular websites such as HipHopDX, 2DopeBoyz, Complex Magazine and others. The independent project landed Niko an interview with Vibe Magazine and aligned him with regional tastemakers, such as DJ Smallz and Ayo the Producer.

2013 - Good Blood LP

Good Blood, a precursor to his long awaited Brutus project, was Niko's first release in 2014. The title is the literal English translation of the Brazilian term, 'Sangue Bom' and Niko says that he created many characters in the album to be direct representations of his culture. Good Blood was entirely produced by Thanks Joey with the exception of  the self-produced "Onda". The project received positive reviews, with Orlando Weekly commenting, "Bigger than his fro and a clear level up, Good Blood is the sound of an artist hitting major-league stride." In May 2013, Niko recorded a song with industry veteran, Talib Kweli, for his Brutus project. Kweli then developed an interest in Niko's career and had asked him to join his recently formed Javotti Media label.

Brutus - Present

Niko released Brutus, with longtime collaborator, Thanks Joey. The album was released through Javotti Media and features Talib Kweli and other notable artists. upon release of the album Dan-O writing for Freemusicempire passionately presented praise for the album "Niko is less silly on Brutus (still very silly) and more focused on rapping himself into history. I always think of it as that Reasonable Doubt mindstate; that album is special because you can feel Jay saying “if this is my one shot I’ve got to tell you everything” and this is Niko’s statement."

Since the release of Brutus, along with his creative-partner, Thanks Joey, Niko has been working extensively with Colours of the Culture, a global collective of visual artists and musicians. Colours released their first collaborative project, Roy G Biv: What a Colorful World in October 2015. The album features guest appearances from Talib Kweli, Styles P, Niko Is and other Colours of the Culture affiliates.

Niko Is appeared on four songs on Talib Kweli & 9th Wonder's collaborative effort, Indie 500, released in November 2015.

Discography

Mixtapes

Albums

Extended plays

Collaboration albums

Collaboration extended plays

References

http://freemusicempire.com/2015/02/11/song-of-the-year-private-room-by-niko-is-produced-by-thanks-joey-or-my-pitch-for-you-to-buy-the-brutus-lp

1988 births
Living people
Rappers from Florida
Musicians from Rio de Janeiro (city)
Dr. Phillips High School alumni
21st-century American rappers